Barend Bispinck (1622 in Dordrecht – after 1658), was a Dutch Golden Age landscape painter.

According to Houbraken he was a pupil of Jan Both.

According to the RKD he was a pupil of Jan Both in Utrecht in 1646. He married in Dordrecht 29 December 1654 with Maria van Diemen, but his wife died the next year and he then worked in the Hague and in Hulst in 1658. Nothing more is known of him after 1658.

References

1622 births
1637 deaths
Dutch Golden Age painters
Dutch male painters
Dutch landscape painters
Artists from Dordrecht